Branscum is a surname. Notable people with the surname include:

David Branscum, American politician
Eric Branscum (born 1984), American screenwriter
Josh Branscum (born 1982), American politician
Robbie Branscum (1934–1997), American author